Plus-size or plus-sized may refer to:
Plus-size clothing, a general term given to clothing proportioned specifically for people around size 18 and up in the U.S.
Plus-size model, a fashion model who specializes in modeling the above-mentioned clothing
Plus sizing, the practice of changing a vehicle's wheels to a larger size and reducing the size of the tires (tyres) to compensate